America Is Dying Slowly (a backronym for AIDS) is a compilation album about HIV/AIDS awareness and prevention. It is the first hip-hop benefit album about this subject, and the second Red Hot Organization project focused on HIV/AIDS awareness in communities of color in the United States. It is the eighth album in the Red Hot AIDS Benefit Series. It featured collaborations from several hip hop acts, including Mobb Deep, De La Soul, Coolio, Biz Markie, Chubb Rock, The Lost Boyz, Pete Rock, Common and Wu-Tang Clan.

Dubbed “a masterpiece” by The Source on its release, AIDS was one of the first of such efforts aimed at reaching out to African American men through pop culture.

Track listing

References

External links 
America Is Dying Slowly at Discogs
Rapping Down AIDS Metroactive article

Albums produced by Ant Banks
Albums produced by Buckwild
Albums produced by Da Beatminerz
Albums produced by Diamond D
Albums produced by L.E.S. (record producer)
Albums produced by No I.D.
Albums produced by Organized Noize
Albums produced by Pete Rock
Albums produced by Prince Paul (producer)
Albums produced by RZA
Hip hop compilation albums
Red Hot Organization albums
1996 compilation albums